WGCU-FM (90.1 FM) is an NPR-member radio station. Licensed to Fort Myers, Florida, United States, the station is owned by Florida Gulf Coast University.  WGCU also operates WMKO 91.7, a full-time satellite station licensed to Marco Island to serve the Naples area.  As of June 25, 2018 WGCU's schedule is entirely NPR news and talk programming.

WGCU-FM first signed on in 1983 as WSFP-FM, a station owned by the University of South Florida in Tampa, owners of public broadcasting stations WUSF FM and TV.  At the time, Fort Myers / Naples was the only media market in Florida without any public broadcasting stations.  WSFP-FM was largely a rebroadcast of WUSF-FM.

The broadcast license was transferred to the new Florida Gulf Coast University in 1996.  WSFP-FM changed its calls to WGCU-FM on June 13, 1997, two months before FGCU opened.

Despite operating at a full 100,000 watts, the main WGCU-FM signal is barely listenable in parts of Collier County.  This is because its transmitter is located in southern Charlotte County;  however, its grade B signal reaches much of northern Collier County, including much of Naples itself.  Soon after FGCU opened, it requested funding for a second station to improve its coverage in Naples.  WMKO signed on for the first time in 1999, filling in coverage gaps in southern Collier County.

HD Radio Programming
For its first 13 years as a locally focused station, WGCU-FM aired a mix of NPR news and classical music.  
HD2 - In 2009, WGCU moved its classical music programming to a 24/7 feed on its second digital subchannel. In 2012 when Classical South Florida affiliate WNPS signed on in the market, the HD2 changed to xPonential Radio, a Triple-A format produced by WXPN in Philadelphia. As of June 25, 2018, the xPonential Radio service ended, the classical format moved from HD3 to HD2 and the HD3 subchannel was discontinued.

WGCU has also been referenced for hurricane information on highway signs across Southwest Florida, mainly the 90.1 WGCU-FM signal.

See also
 WGCU Television

References

External links
WGCU Public Media

GCU-FM
Radio stations established in 1983
NPR member stations
Mass media in Fort Myers, Florida
Florida Gulf Coast University
1983 establishments in Florida
GCU-FM